Scaling is a village in the borough of Redcar and Cleveland and the ceremonial county of North Yorkshire, England

External links

Villages in North Yorkshire
Places in the Tees Valley
Loftus, North Yorkshire